All My Relations is a 5-minute short animated film from 1990, directed by Joanna Priestley and made from drawings on paper with 3-D frames.

Summary
It satirizes the pitfalls of romance, from marriage, childbirth and upward mobility to the disintegration of a relationship. The animation
is framed by a series of sculptural assemblages, which emphasize the message implied by the archetypal characters whose dilemmas may be familiar
to those who have bought into the American Dream.

Reception
Los Angeles Times stated that it "blends a screeching sound track with ineptly drawn visuals".

See also
Independent animation
Experimental film

External links
All My Relations on IMDb

References

1990 films
1990 animated films
1990 short films
1990s American animated films
American animated short films
1990s animated short films
Films directed by Joanna Priestley